Yaya is a sandy islet in Russia, in the New Siberian Islands, Laptev Sea. Its length is about 370 metres and is 125 metres wide. Discovered in 2013, it expanded the Russian maritime exclusive economic zone by 452 square kilometers.

Discovery

It was sighted in September 2014 from a helicopter which delivered cargo for the construction of a military base on Kotelny Island. In November 2014 the research vessel Admiral Vladimirsky explored the island and officially confirmed its existence. The commander of the helicopter crew explained the name 'Yaya'. "Ya" (я) means the pronoun "I" in Russian. When the island was sighted, everybody started shouting: "I, I discovered it!"

References

Islands of the Laptev Sea
Islands of the Sakha Republic
New islands